Air Vice Marshal (retd.) Fakhrul Azam, ndc, psc was the Chief of the Air Staff of Bangladesh Air Force from 2002 to 2007. He studied in the prestigious Sargodha College of Pakistan Air Force. He was in the Tempest house (694-T). He left the institution in 1965 after completing his Senior Cambridge. He was commissioned in the Pakistan Air Force on 13 March 1971 from the 51st GD(P) Course. Fakhrul was appointed as the 'Chief of the Air Staff of Bangladesh Air Force' on 8 April 2002 by then-Prime Minister Khaleda Zia.

References 

 

Bangladesh Air Force air marshals
Possibly living people
Year of birth missing
PAF College Sargodha alumni
Chiefs of Air Staff (Bangladesh)
National Defence College, India alumni